Andrew Boylan may refer to:

 Andrew Boylan (bishop) (1842–1910), Irish prelate of the Roman Catholic Church 
 Andrew Boylan (politician) (born 1939), Irish Fine Gael politician